Ceroplesis sumptuosa is a species of beetle in the family Cerambycidae. It was described by Pascoe in 1875. It is known from South Africa, Angola, Zimbabwe and Malawi.

References

sumptuosa
Beetles described in 1875